Rose Peak is a peak in the Diablo Range of California and is the officially listed highest point in Alameda County, though other sources claim the high point is actually nearby Discovery Peak.

References

See also
 List of highest points in California by county

Mountains of Alameda County, California
Diablo Range
Mountains of the San Francisco Bay Area
Mountains of Northern California